The following is a List of Romanian communists, including both activists of the Romanian Communist Party (PCR) and people actively engaged in other communist groups (including people of Romanian origin who were members of communist parties in other countries).

Note
Toward the end of the PCR's existence, membership was dramatically increased based on several, mainly artificial, criteria (to almost 4 million members for a total population of 22 million in 1989 — in relative terms, it was the strongest communist party); thus, membership in the party after ca. 1968 is not in itself a relevant factor in establishing whether a person was in fact a communist. Simple members of the PCR who have not been engaged in party politics or held political offices should not be included here.

General Secretaries of the PCR

Activists of the PCR

 Constantin Agiu
 Ștefan Andrei
 Ecaterina Arbore
 Olga Bancic
 Maria Banuș
 Aurel Baranga
 Eugen Barbu
 Alexandru Bârlădeanu
 Mihai Beniuc
 Emil Bobu
 Francisc Boczor
 Emil Bodnăraș
 Petre Borilă
 G. Brătescu
 Béla Breiner
 Silviu Brucan
 Simion Bughici
 Teodor Bugnariu
 Avram Bunaciu
 
 Scarlat Callimachi
 Emil Calmanovici
 Ion Călugăru
 Elena Ceaușescu
 Ilie Ceaușescu
 Marin Ceaușescu
 Nicu Ceaușescu
 Dumitru Cernicica
 Iosif Chișinevschi
 Mihai Chițac
 Vladimir Colin
 Dumitru Coliu
 Teodor Coman
 Alecu Constantinescu
 Miron Constantinescu
 Petre Constantinescu-Iași
 
 Constanța Crăciun
 Nicolae Cristea
 Ovid Crohmălniceanu
 Mihail Cruceanu
 Constantin Dăscălescu
 Constantin David
 Ion Dincă
 Alexandru Dobrogeanu-Gherea
 
 Constantin Doncea
 Alexandru Drăghici
 Petru Dumitriu
 David Fabian
 
 Elena Filipescu
 Leonte Filipescu
 Suzana Gâdea
 Justin Georgescu
 Paul Georgescu
 Teohari Georgescu
 Petre Gheorghe
 
 Dumitru Grofu
 Boris Holban
 
 Alexandru Iacob
 Nestor Ignat
 Aladar Imre
 Alexandru Iliescu
 Ion Iliescu
 
 Iorgu Iordan
 George Ivașcu
 Alexandru Jar
 Ionel Jora
 
 Remus Koffler
 
 David Korner
 
 Leon Lichtblau
 Haia Lifșiț
 
 Gherasim Luca
 Vasile Luca
 Mihail Macavei
 George Macovescu
 Mihai Magheru
 Corneliu Mănescu
 Manea Mănescu
 Șmil Marcovici
 Gheorghe Gaston Marin
 Timotei Marin
 Gheorghe Maurer
 Vasile Milea
 Alexandru Moghioroș
 Nicolae Moraru
 Ghiță Moscu
 Nicolae Militaru
 Costin Murgescu
 Alexandru Nicolski
 
 Paul Niculescu-Mizil
 Ion Niculi
 
 
 Saul Ozias
 Octavian Paler
 Francisc Panet
 
 Miron Radu Paraschivescu
 Ion Pas
 Vasile Patilineț
 Ana Pauker
 Marcel Pauker
 Lucrețiu Pătrășcanu
 Paul Păun
 Adrian Păunescu
 Ilie Pintilie
 Constantin Pîrvulescu
 Ștefan Plavăț
 Nicolae Pleșiță
 Dumitru Radu Popescu
 Nicolae Popescu-Doreanu
 
 Mihai Popilian
 Tudor Postelnicu
 Grigore Preoteasa
 Grigore Răceanu
 Lothar Rădăceanu
 Gogu Rădulescu
 Iosif Rangheț
 Leonte Răutu
 Vasile Roaită
 Stephan Roll
 Mihail Roller
 Valter Roman
 Eugen Rozvan
 Alexandru Sahia
 Leontin Sălăjan
 Filimon Sârbu
 
 Alexandra Sidorovici
 Matei Socor
 
 
 Pompiliu Ștefu
 Chivu Stoica
 
 Pavel Tcacenko
 
 Solomon Tinkelman
 Leonte Tismăneanu
 Alexandru Toma
 
 Ioan Totu
 Virgil Trofin
 Dolfi Trost
 Eugen Țurcanu
 Ilie Văduva
 
 
 Gheorghe Vasilichi
 Ghizela Vass
 Ilie Verdeț
 Gheza Vida
 Ion Vincze
 Ion Vitner
 
 Ștefan Voitec
 Richard Wurmbrand
 Belu Zilber

Romanian communists not affiliated with the PCR

 Martin Abern
 Haig Acterian
 Octav Băncilă
 Geo Bogza
 Mihai Gheorghiu Bujor
 Ilie Cătărău
 N. D. Cocea
 Ion Dic Dicescu
 Constantin M. Gălbeoru
 Leon Ghelerter
 Max Goldstein
 Traian Herseni
 Boris Holban
 Panait Istrati
 Rodion Markovits
 Alexandru Nicolau
 Mihail Polihroniade
 Constantin Popovici
 Christian Rakovsky
 Alexandru Robot
 Wilhelm Stepper-Tristis
 Tristan Tzara
 Gheorghe I. Ungureanu

See also
Amicii URSS
Romanian Society for Friendship with the Soviet Union
List of communists imprisoned by the Kingdom of Romania

Communists